Kamalnayan Bajaj (23 January 1915 – 1 May 1972) was an Indian businessman and politician.

Biography

Early life and education 
He was the elder son of Jamnalal Bajaj. He was born on 23 January 1915. He consolidated the Bajaj Group after inheriting it from his uncle in 1954. He completed his education from Cambridge University in England.

Business career 
He diversified the interests of the Bajaj Group into the manufacture of scooters; three-wheelers; and cement, alloy casting and electrical equipment.

Kamalnayan Bajaj had three children, Rahul Bajaj, Suman Jain and Shishir Bajaj. Rahul Bajaj is his elder son.

Political career 
He was elected to Lok Sabha three times from Wardha (Lok Sabha constituency) from 1957 to 1971. He lost in 1971 after he had joined the Congress (O) in 1969 with his friend Morarji Desai.

Death 
He died at the age of 57 on 1 May 1972.

References

Bajaj Group
1915 births
1972 deaths
India MPs 1957–1962
India MPs 1962–1967
India MPs 1967–1970
Lok Sabha members from Maharashtra
People from Wardha
Kamalnayan
Indian National Congress politicians from Maharashtra